Berdún is a locality and the capital of the municipality of Canal de Berdún, in Huesca province, Aragon, Spain. As of 2020, it has a population of 210.

Geography 
Berdún is located 82km northwest of Huesca.

References

Populated places in the Province of Huesca